The Scotland women's national football team represents Scotland in international women's football competitions. Since 1998, the team has been governed by the Scottish Football Association (SFA). Scotland qualified in the FIFA Women's World Cup for the first time in 2019, and qualified for their first UEFA Women's Euro in 2017.

This list includes all players who have made at least one appearance for the national team. The SFA maintains a Women's International Roll of Honour, which recognises players who have won 50 or more caps for the national team.

List of players
Key

References

 
Women
Scotland
Association football player non-biographical articles